Porto (from Latin portus, harbour, alternatively Oporto) may refer to a number of people, places, things may also refer to:

Wine
Port wine (especially from Portugal)

Places

Angola
Porto Amboim

Brazil
Porto Seguro
Porto Velho
Porto Ferreira
 Porto Alegre
Grêmio Foot-Ball Porto Alegrense, its football club
Porto Feliz
Clube Atlético do Porto, a football club

Benin
Porto-Novo

France
Porto-Vecchio, a municipality of the Corse-du-Sud department, Corsica
Porto (Corsica), small village on the west coast of the island, near the Calanques de Piana, Corsica

Greece
Porto Carras
Porto Cheli

Italy
 Porto (Italy), a port at the Tiber mouth and suburbicarian bishopric
 Porto, Castiglione del Lago, a frazione of Castiglione del Lago, Perugia
 Porto, a locality in the comune of Galzignano Terme, in the Province of Padua, Veneto

Municipalities 
 Porto Azzurro, in the Province of Livorno, Tuscany
 Porto Mantovano, in the Province of Mantua, Lombardy
 Porto Tolle, in the Province of Rovigo, Veneto
 Porto Torres, in the Province of Sassari, Sardinia
 Porto Valtravaglia, in the Province of Varese, Lombardy
 Porto Venere, in the Province of La Spezia, Liguria
 Porto Viro, in the Province of Rovigo, Veneto
 Portocannone, in the Province of Campobasso, Molise
 Portoferraio, in the Province of Livorno, Tuscany
 Loiri Porto San Paolo, in the Province of Olbia-Tempio, Sardinia

Hamlets 
 Porto Cervo, in the municipality of Arzachena (OT), Sardinia
 Porto d'Ascoli, in the municipality of San Benedetto del Tronto (AP), Marche
 Porto Ercole, in the municipality of Monte Argentario (GR), Tuscany
 Porto Ottiolu, in the municipality of Budoni (OT), Sardinia
 Porto Potenza Picena, a civil parish of Potenza Picena (MC), in the Marche
 Porto Santo Stefano, municipal seat of Monte Argentario (GR), Tuscany

Portugal

Continental Portugal
Porto
Futebol Clube do Porto, a football club based in the city
Grande Porto, a.k.a. Grande Área Metropolitana do Porto
Porto District
Porto Metro
Porto Vivo
Portalegre
Porto Covo
Salir do Porto

Madeira
Porto Santo Island
Porto Moniz

Azores
Vila do Porto

Spain
Porto de Sanabria

People
 Georges de Porto-Riche (1849–1930), French dramatist and novelist
 Sasckya Porto, Brazilian Playmate
 Vanessa Porto (born 1984), Brazilian mixed martial artist

Arts and entertainment 
Porto (film), 2015
"Porto", 2014 song by Worakls
"Porto", 2021 song and single by Spekti
Porto, a villain in Power Rangers: Turbo

Other 
Oporto (restaurant), an Australian restaurant chain
 Oporto (grape), an alternative name for the German wine grape Blauer Portugieser
Blaufränkisch, Austrian wine grape that is also known as Oporto
 Oporto (Madrid Metro), a station on Line 5 and 6

See also

Portus (disambiguation)